The Bishop of Lynn is an episcopal title used by a suffragan bishop of the Church of England Diocese of Norwich, in the Province of Canterbury, England. The title takes its name after the town of King's Lynn in Norfolk; the See was erected under the Suffragans Nomination Act 1888 by Order in Council dated 26 June 1963. The Bishop of Lynn has particular oversight of the Archdeaconry of Lynn.

The present bishop is Jane Steen, who was consecrated at Norwich Cathedral on 23 June 2021.

List of Bishops of Lynn

References

External links
 Crockford's Clerical Directory - Listings

Bishops of Lynn
Anglican suffragan bishops in the Diocese of Norwich